Eugenio Cavallini (16 June 1806 — 11 April 1881) was an Italian conductor, composer, violinist, and violist. In 1833 he became first violinist of the orchestra at La Scala, a post he held through 1855. He also served as a conductor at La Scala, notably leading the world premieres of Gaetano Donizetti's Lucrezia Borgia (1833), Donizetti's Gemma di Vergy (1834), Donizetti's Maria Stuarda (1835), Saverio Mercadante's Il giuramento (1837), Mercadante's Il bravo (1839), Giuseppe Verdi's Oberto (1839), Verdi's Un giorno di regno (1840), Donizetti's Maria Padilla (1841), Verdi's Nabucco (1842), Verdi's I Lombardi alla prima crociata (1843), Verdi's Giovanna d'Arco (1845), Federico Ricci's Estella di Murcia (1846), and Domenico Ronzani's Salvator Rosa (1854).

At La Scala Cavallini also conducted performances of Vincenzo Bellini's La sonnambula (1834), Donizetti's L'elisir d'amore (1834), Bellini's I puritani (1835), Daniel Auber's La muette de Portici (1838), Donizetti's Lucia di Lammermoor (1839), Donizetti's La fille du régiment (1840), Donizetti's Don Pasquale (1843), Donizetti's Linda di Chamounix (1844), Verdi's Ernani (1844), Verdi's Attila (1846), Verdi's Jérusalem (1850), Verdi's Rigoletto (1853), Verdi's Il trovatore (1853), Giacomo Meyerbeer's Les Huguenots (1854), Donizetti's Maria di Rohan (1855), Gioachino Rossini's The Barber of Seville (1855), Errico Petrella's Marco Visconti (1855), and Rossini's Otello (1855).

Selected works
 Divertimento in G major for viola solo and string quartet (or string orchestra) (1829)
 Guida per lo studio della viola (Viola Method), Book II: 24 Studi in tuoni minori (24 Studies in Minor Keys) for viola solo (c.1845)
 Guida per lo studio della viola (Viola Method), Book III: Concert Pieces for viola and piano (c.1845)
     Fantasia
     Souvenir
     Fantasia originale (a.k.a. Fantasia) for viola and piano (or 2 violas, 2 cellos and double bass)
     Tema con Variazioni
     Polacca
     Fantasia originale
     Tema Variato (Theme and Variations) in E major
     Adagio Variato dell'Opera Poliuto
     Serenata
 Riminiscenze di Santa Cristina, Fantasy for solo viola, 2 violas, 2 cellos and double bass

References

1806 births
1881 deaths
Italian male composers
Italian conductors (music)
Italian male conductors (music)
Italian classical violinists
Italian classical violists
19th-century Italian composers
19th-century conductors (music)
19th-century classical violinists
Male classical violinists